Stillwater is an animated children's television series based on Zen Shorts by Jon J. Muth. The series premiered on December 4, 2020 on Apple TV+. It was renewed for a second season, which premiered on March 18, 2022. Season 3 will be released on May 19, 2023.

Cast and characters
 James Sie as Stillwater
 Judah Mackey as Karl
 Eva Binder as Addy
 Tucker Chandler as Michael

Episodes

Season 1 (2020–21)

Season 2 (2022)

Release
On September 17, 2020, Apple announced Stillwater, along with the rest of its late-2020 children's programming lineup for Apple TV+. The six-episode first season was released on December 4, 2020. The episode "The Impossible Dream" was submitted to the Annecy Festival on June 14, 2021.

Accolades
In 2021, the show won a Peabody Award, along with the Disney Channel animated series The Owl House.

References

External links
 
Official trailer
Excerpt

2020 American television series debuts
2020s American animated television series
2020 French television series debuts
2020s French animated television series
American children's animated comedy television series
American computer-animated television series
American television shows based on children's books
Animated television series about bears
Apple TV+ original programming
English-language television shows
French children's animated comedy television series
French computer-animated television series
French television shows based on children's books
Fictional pandas
Television series by Gaumont International Television
Peabody Award-winning television programs
Apple TV+ children's programming
Children's and Family Emmy Award winners